Mario Leite Neto (10 June 1931 – 1 November 1979) was a Brazilian equestrian. He competed in two events at the 1960 Summer Olympics.

References

External links
 

1931 births
1979 deaths
Brazilian male equestrians
Olympic equestrians of Brazil
Equestrians at the 1960 Summer Olympics
Sportspeople from Sergipe